Mercier is a provincial electoral district in the Montreal region of Quebec, Canada that elects members to the National Assembly of Quebec.  It consists of part of the Le Plateau-Mont-Royal borough of the city of Montreal.

It was created for the 1966 election from parts of Montréal-Mercier and Montréal–Saint-Louis electoral districts.

In the change from the 2001 to the 2011 electoral map, its territory was unchanged. In the change from the 2011 to the 2017 electoral map, the riding gained the remainder of the Mile End neighbourhood from Outremont.

It was named in honour of former Quebec Premier Honoré Mercier.

Members of the Legislative Assembly / National Assembly

Election results

* Result compared to Action démocratique

References

External links
Information
 Elections Quebec

Election results
 Election results (National Assembly)
 Election results (QuébecPolitique)

Maps
 2011 map (PDF)
 2001 map (Flash)
2001–2011 changes (Flash)
1992–2001 changes (Flash)
 Electoral map of Montreal region
 Quebec electoral map, 2011

Provincial electoral districts of Montreal
Mercier